Morlot is a surname. Notable people with the surname include:

 Antoine Morlot (1766–1809), French military leader
 François-Nicholas-Madeleine Morlot (1795–1762), French prelate of the Roman Catholic Church 
 Ludovic Morlot (born 1973), French conductor of classical music

See also
 Adolph von Morlot